Staunton High School is a public high school in Staunton, Virginia, United States. It is a part of Staunton City Schools, a public school district that also includes three elementary schools, a middle school, and an alternative education program.

History
Staunton High School was originally opened in the early 1900s and renamed Robert E. Lee High School in 1914 during the monthly school board meeting held on April 30, 1914 at the urging of the United Daughters of the Confederacy.  The school was named after Robert E. Lee, commander of the Confederate States Army, who also led the Army of Northern Virginia during the Civil War.  The original building, at 274 Churchville Avenue, is in Colonial Revival style. The two-story brick central block is topped by a slate hipped roof with a cupola in the center and strongly detailed pediments facing the street. Flanking wings were added in 1954.

In 1983, the school moved to what had been John Lewis Junior High School, on North Coalter Street. The original building subsequently housed a summer ESL school and a parochial school operated by the Roman Catholic Diocese of Richmond, and was later renovated into senior apartments. It was added to the National Register of Historic Places in 2009.

In July 2014 The News Leader received a letter to the editor that suggested renaming Robert E. Lee High School; The majority of the newspaper's editorial board and key employees agreed and suggested possible names. In August 2017, in the wake of the Unite the Right rally in Charlottesville, Virginia, the editorial board stated that it may be "tougher" to keep the school named after Lee. In October 2018, after months of debate, as well as "focus groups and community listening sessions" conducted by the Virginia Center For Inclusive Communities, the Staunton School Board voted 4–2 in favor of renaming the school. The next month, following a public survey with over 4,000 submissions, it was decided the school would return to its original name, Staunton High School. The change took effect on July 1, 2019.

Notable alumni
 Francis Collins – geneticist with the Human Genome Project
 John C. Reed – cell biologist with Roche Pharmaceuticals
 Larry Sheets – former MLB player (Baltimore Orioles, Detroit Tigers, Seattle Mariners)
 Frederick Swann – composer and concert organist

References

External links 
Staunton High School

School buildings on the National Register of Historic Places in Virginia
Public high schools in Virginia
Colonial Revival architecture in Virginia
School buildings completed in 1926
Schools in Staunton, Virginia
National Register of Historic Places in Staunton, Virginia
1926 establishments in Virginia